Slovak Olympic and Sports Committee (SOŠV) is the National Olympic Committee representing Slovakia in the International Olympic Committee. It is based in Bratislava, Slovakia.

History

The Slovak Olympic Committee (SOV) was founded on 19 December 1992 and recognized on 20 January 1993. It is one of two successors of the Czechoslovak Olympic Committee (ČSOV) which dissolved on 27 March 1993. SOC was approved as National Olympic Committee of Slovak Republic in Monte Carlo on 24 September 1993. In December 2018 it changed its name to the Slovak Olympic and Sports Committee.

List of presidents

Executive committee
President: Anton Siekel
Vice Presidents: Peter Korčok, Zdenko Kríž, Jozef Gönci
 Members: Monika Šišková, Jozef Jurášek, Matej Tóth, Daniel Líška, Robert Petriska, Marián Vanderka, Ľubor Halanda, Danka Barteková

Member federations
The Slovak National Federations are the organizations that coordinate all aspects of their individual sports. They are responsible for training, competition and development of their sports. There are currently 30 Olympic Summer and 6 Winter Sport Federations in Slovakia.

See also
 Slovakia at the Olympics

References

External links
 Official website

Slovakia
Slovakia at the Olympics
1992 establishments in Slovakia
Oly